Samuel Gowon Edoumiekumo (born 30 April 1970) is a Nigerian professor of Economics who was the former deputy Vice Chancellor of Niger Delta University and currently the 4th substantive Vice Chancellor of same school.

Background and early life 
Samuel Edoumiekumo obtained his First School Leaving Certificate from Akeindenowei primary school, Toru Angiama 1982 and his West Africa school certificate from Ajeromi Ifelodun High School, Lagos 1988. He holds a Bachelor of Science Degree, a Master of Science Degree and two Doctor of Philosophy Degrees which he obtained from the University of Port Harcourt and the University of Nsukka in the field of Economics.

Career 
On 17 May 2017, the then Bayelsa State Governor, Seriake Dickson approved the appointment of Samuel Edoumiekumo as Acting Vice Chancellor following the expiration of the tenure of the former Vice Chancellor, Prof. Humprey Ogoni. On May 2, 2018, he was appointed the 4th substantive Vice Chancellor of the school
He is also the Chairman of the Committee of Vice-Chancellors of Nigerian Universities.

References 

Living people
1970 births
Vice-Chancellors of Niger Delta University